Kim Sun-woo (born January 23, 1986) is a South Korean football player who played for Suwon FC in the K League Challenge.

References

External links

1986 births
Living people
South Korean footballers
Incheon United FC players
Gimcheon Sangmu FC players
Suwon FC players
K League 1 players
Hanyang University alumni
Association football midfielders